Pierre-Hugues Herbert and Nicolas Mahut were the defending champions, but lost in the second round to Novak Djokovic and Viktor Troicki.

Raven Klaasen and Rajeev Ram won the title, defeating Łukasz Kubot and Marcelo Melo in the final, 6–7(1–7), 6–4, [10–8].

Seeds

Draw

Finals

Top half

Bottom half

References
 Main Draw

BNP Paribas Open - Men's Doubles
2017 BNP Paribas Open